These are the number-one hits on the Top 100 Singles chart in 1981 as published by Cash Box magazine.

See also
1981 in music
List of Hot 100 number-one singles of 1981 (U.S.)

References
http://members.aol.com/_ht_a/randypny4/cashbox/1981.html
http://www.cashboxmagazine.com/archives/80s_files/1981.html
http://musicseek.info/no1hits/1981.htm

1981
1981 record charts
1981 in American music